Fimbristylis laxiglumis is a sedge of the family Cyperaceae that is native to Australia.

It blooms between March and April and produces brown flowers.

In Western Australia it is found in the Kimberley region where it grows in black clay soils.

References

Plants described in 1990
Flora of Western Australia
laxiglumis